is a Japanese football player. He plays for Blaublitz Akita.

Career
Torai Kamata joined J3 League club Blaublitz Akita in 2017.

Honours
 Blaublitz Akita
 J3 League (1): 2017

References

External links

1999 births
Living people
Association football people from Akita Prefecture
Japanese footballers
J3 League players
Blaublitz Akita players
Association football midfielders